Edwight is an unincorporated community in Raleigh County, West Virginia. Edwight was also known as Launa.

References 

Unincorporated communities in West Virginia
Unincorporated communities in Raleigh County, West Virginia
Coal towns in West Virginia